The Lordsburg Hidalgo County Museum is located in Lordsburg, New Mexico. It features a World War II Internment and POW exhibit and a Hidalgo County Cattle Growers Association Hall of Fame Room. Other exhibits include mining, rocks and minerals, antique tools, area ranching heritage, bottles and railroads.

External links
Hidalgo County Museums official website

 
Cowboy halls of fame
Halls of fame in New Mexico
Military and war museums in New Mexico
Museums in Hidalgo County, New Mexico
Natural history museums in New Mexico